Landon Liboiron (born March 10, 1991) is a Canadian actor. He is best known for playing Declan Coyne in Degrassi: The Next Generation and his lead role as Peter Rumancek in Netflix's original series Hemlock Grove (2013–15).

Early life 
Liboiron was born the youngest  of three boys in a small farming community in Jenner, Alberta, where he and his two older brothers were raised. He is the son of Lorraine Mack and Marcel Liboiron. His mother, an artist, supportive of his desire to act, once drove her son to Vancouver for acting classes and auditions.

Career 
Liboiron was cast in TV films before his breakout role in the Canadian teen drama television series Degrassi: The Next Generation.  In 2011, Liboiron played Josh Shannon in the sci-fi television series Terra Nova, the son of the lead character, played by Jason O'Mara, and his wife, played by Shelley Conn.

In 2013, Liboiron was cast in a lead role opposite Bill Skarsgård and Famke Janssen as high school student and Romani werewolf Peter Rumancek in the Netflix original series Hemlock Grove. Liboiron reprised his role in the second and third season of the series.

In 2017, Liboiron was cast as Carter / Sam Meehan in the Blumhouse supernatural thriller film Truth or Dare. The film was released in theaters on April 13, 2018.

Filmography

Film

Television

Web

Awards and nominations

References

External links 

Canadian male film actors
Canadian male child actors
People from Special Areas, Alberta
Living people
Male actors from Alberta
Canadian male television actors
Canadian people of French descent
Canadian people of German descent
1992 births